HU Aquarii (abbreviated HU Aqr) is an eclipsing binary system approximately 620 light-years away from the Sun, forming a cataclysmic variable of AM Herculis-type. The two stars orbit each other every 2.08 hours and the ultra-short binary system includes an eclipsing white dwarf and red dwarf.

Eclipse timing variations 

The HU Aquarii binary system exhibits variations in the timing of the eclipses. Schwarz et al. (2009) note that the variations are too large to be caused by the Applegate mechanism, and are within the expected range of magnetic braking but 30 times too large to be caused by gravitational radiation alone. As an alternative explanation, they suggested that the variations might be caused by an object in orbit around the binary, causing it to move back and forth along the line-of-sight to the system. In March 2011, Qian et al. claimed the presence of two planets, though the proposed orbits were subsequently shown to be unstable and on orbits determined from a more thorough and precise analysis of the observational data. Indeed, it seems likely that the signal that was interpreted as being the result of planetary companions might be instead the result of not well-studied interactions between the white dwarf and its red dwarf companion: as of 2014 all proposed orbital solutions have been refuted and it appears that the full set of timing measurements is inconsistent with any 1, 2 or 3-planet system due to poor fits to the data and unstable orbital configurations. With new data gathered by 2018, the existence of planetary system remains elusive, as no model fitting all observations can be made.

See also 
 HW Virginis
 NN Serpentis
 QS Virginis
 Kepler-16

References 

Aquarius (constellation)
Eclipsing binaries
Hypothetical planetary systems
Aquarii, HU
White dwarfs
M-type main-sequence stars
Polars (cataclysmic variable stars)
J21075818-0517404